Samba Esquema Novo is the 1963 debut album by Brazilian singer-songwriter and guitarist Jorge Ben. It includes the original recording of the international hit "Mas que Nada".

Release and reception 
By the time of the album's release, newspaper O Estado de S. Paulo believed it would soon disappear from the stores, just like his previous 78 RPM releases.

In 2007, it was listed by Rolling Stone Brazil as one of the 100 best Brazilian albums in history. American critic Rodney Taylor wrote of the album: "His first album, which translates to 'New Style Samba,' sets out his ambitions. Spritely, percussive guitar anchors the songs, and Ben's smooth/rough voice puts them across. Horns, percussion and strings color the tunes, but never pull the focus from Ben. 'Mas que Nada' ranks as one of the most popular songs in the world."

Track listing
All tracks written by Jorge Ben except where noted

 "Mas que Nada" – 3:02
 "Tim Dom Dom" – 2:21 (João Mello / Clodoaldo Brito)
 "Balança Pema" – 1:29
 "Vem Morena" – 1:59
 "Chove Chuva" – 3:06
 "É Só Sambar" – 2:06
 "Rosa, Menina Rosa" – 2:15
 "Quero Esquecer Você" – 2:22
 "Uála Uálalá" – 2:09
 "A Tamba" – 3:04
 "Menina Bonita Não Chora" – 2:07
 "Por Causa de Você, Menina" –  2:47

Personnel
According to AllMusic:
Jorge Ben –  vocals, violão
Manuel Gusmão – bass
Luís Carlos Vinhas - piano
J. T. Meirelles – flute, saxophone
Pedro Paulo – trumpet
Dom Um Romão – drums

References

External links 
 

1963 debut albums
Jorge Ben albums
Philips Records albums